The Pteromalidae are a very large family of mostly parasitoid wasps, with some 3,450 described species in about 640 genera (the number was greater, but many species and genera have been reduced by synonymy in recent years). The subfamily-level divisions of the family are highly contentious and unstable, and the family is thought to be "artificial", composed of numerous, distantly related groups (polyphyletic). Accordingly, details of their life histories range over nearly the entire range possible within the Chalcidoidea, though the majority are (as with most chalcidoids) parasitoids of other insects. They are found throughout the world in virtually all habitats, and many are important as biological control agents. The oldest known fossil is known from the Early Cretaceous.

In essence, a "pteromalid" is any member of the Chalcidoidea that has five-segmented tarsi and does not have the defining features of any of the remaining families with five-segmented tarsi. It is highly probable that this family will be divided into several families in the near future.

Description 
Pteromalidae are usually metallic Chalcidoids of varying body size (from 1–48 mm long) and build (slender to quite robust), with the tarsi of the fore and hind legs consisting of five segments. They carry antennae consisting of eight to thirteen segments (including up to 3 anelli); in fully winged forms have in the fore wing a marginal vein that is at least several times longer than broad; very often have well-developed postmarginal and stigmal veins, although these are occasionally quite short; and nearly always have a distinct speculum.

Ecology 
The life strategies of the species in this family vary greatly. There are both solitary and gregarious species, living outside (ectoparasitoid) or inside their prey (endoparasitoid), koinobionts and idiobionts, primary parasitoids and hyperparasitoids and even predators that kill and consume the prey immediately; they also include fig wasp genera. Because of their parasitoid nature, wasps of this family are often used as biological control agents for destructive pests such as american serpentine leafminers. Pteromalus cassotis is a parasitoid of the monarch butterfly.

Subfamilies (32-35)
Asaphesinae -
Austrosystasinae -
Austroterobiinae -
Ceinae -
Cerocephalinae -
Chromeurytominae -
Cleonyminae -
Coelocybinae -
Colotrechninae -
Cratominae -
Diparinae -
Ditropinotellinae -
Elatoidinae -
Epichrysomallinae -
Erotolepsiinae -
Eunotinae -
Herbertiinae -
Keiraninae -
Leptofoeninae -
Louriciinae -
Macromesinae -
Miscogasterinae -
Nefoeninae -
Neodiparinae -
Ormocerinae -
Panstenoninae -
Parasaphodinae -
Pireninae -
Pteromalinae -
Spalangiinae -
Storeyinae -
Sycoecinae -
Sycoryctinae

List of genera (591 + 1†) 
Ablaxia 
- Abomalus 
- Acaenacis 
- Acerocephala 
- Acoelocyba 
- Acroclisella 
- Acroclisis 
- Acroclisissa 
- Acroclisoides 
- Acroclypa 
- Acrocormus 
- Aditrochus 
- Aeschylia 
- Afropsilocera 
- Agamerion 
- Aggelma 
- Agiommatus 
- Agrilocida 
- Aiemea 
- Allocricellius 
- Alloderma 
- Alticornis 
- Alyxiaphagus 
- Amandia 
- Amazonisca 
- Amblyharma 
- Amblypachus 
- Ambogaster 
- Amerostenus 
- Ammeia 
- Amoturella 
- Amphidocius 
- Andersena 
- Angulifrons 
- Anisopteromalus 
- Ankaratrella 
- Anogmoides 
- Anogmus 
- Anorbanus 
- Apelioma 
- Aphobetus 
- Apsilocera 
- Apycnetron 
- Arachnopteromalus 
- Ardilea 
- Arriva 
- Arthrolytus 
- Asaphes 
- Asaphoideus 
- Asparagobius 
- Atrichomalus 
- Ausasaphes 
- Australeunotus 
- Australicesa 
- Australolaelaps 
- Australurios 
- Austrosystasis 
- Austroterobia 
- Bairamlia 
- Balrogia 
- Baridobius 
- Blascoa 
- Bofuria 
- Boharticus 
- Bohpa 
- Bomburia 
- Bonitoa 
- Boucekina 
- Boucekius 
- Brachycaudonia 
- Brachyscelidiphaga 
- Bruesisca 
- Bubekia 
- Bubekiana 
- Bugacia 
- Bulolosa 
- Bupronotum 
- Caenacis 
- Caenocrepis 
- Callicarolynia 
- Callimerismus 
- Callimomoides 
- Calliprymna 
- Callitula 
- Callocleonymus 
- Calolelaps 
- Cameronella 
- Canada 
- Canberrana 
- Capellia 
- Catolaccus 
- Cavitas 
- Cea 
- Cecidellis 
- Cecidolampa 
- Cecidostiba 
- Cecidoxenus 
- Cephaleta 
- Ceratetra 
- Cerocephala 
- Cerodipara 
- Chadwickia 
- Chalcedectus 
- Chalcidiscelis 
- Cheiropachus 
- Chimaerolelaps 
- Chlorocytus 
- Choetospilisca 
- Chromeurytoma 
- Chrysoglyphe 
- Cleonymus 
- Coelocyba 
- Coelocyboides 
- Coelopisthia 
- Collentis 
- Collessina 
- Colotrechnus 
- Conigastrus 
- Conodipara 
- Conomorium 
- Conophorisca 
- Cooloolana 
- Coruna 
- Cratomus 
- Cryptoprymna 
- Cybopella 
- Cyclogastrella 
- Cyrtogaster 
- Cyrtophagoides 
- Cyrtoptyx 
- Dasycleonymus 
- Dasyneurophaga 
- Delisleia 
- Delucchia 
- Desantisiana 
- Dibrachoides 
- Dibrachys 
- Diconocara 
- Diglochis 
- Dimachus 
- Dinarmoides 
- Dinarmolaelaps 
- Dinarmus 
- Dineuticida 
- Dinotiscus 
- Dinotoides 
- Diourbelia 
- Dipachystigma 
- Dipara 
- Dirhicnus 
- Ditropinotella 
- Divna 
- Doddifoenus 
- Doganlaria 
- Dorcatomophaga 
- Dozodipara 
- Drailea 
- Dudichilla 
- Dvalinia 
- Ecrizotes 
- Ecrizotomorpha 
- Elachertodomyia 
- Elachertoidea 
- Elatoides 
- Elderia 
- Encyrtocephalus 
- Endomychobius 
- Enoggera 
- Eopteromalites 
- Epanogmus 
- Epelatus 
- Epicatolaccus 
- Epicopterus 
- Epipteromalus 
- Epistenia 
- Epiterobia 
- Erdoesia 
- Erdoesina 
- Erixestus 
- Erotolepsia 
- Erotolepsiella 
- Errolia 
- Erythromalus 
- Espinosa 
- Eucoelocybomyia 
- Eulonchetron 
- Eumacepolus 
- Euneura 
- Eunotomyiia 
- Eunotopsia 
- Eunotus 
- Eupelmophotismus 
- Eurydinota 
- Eurydinoteloides 
- Eurydinotomorpha 
- Eurytomomma 
- Eutelisca 
- Euteloida 
- Ezgia 
- Fanamokala 
- Fedelia 
- Ferrierelus 
- Ficicola 
- Fijita 
- Frena 
- Fusiterga 
- Gahanisca 
- Gastracanthus 
- Gastrancistrus 
- Gbelcia 
- Genangula 
- Globimesosoma 
- Globonila 
- Glorimontana 
- Glyphognathus 
- Glyphotoma 
- Gnathophorisca 
- Goidanichium 
- Golovissima 
- Grissellium 
- Grooca 
- Guancheria 
- Gugolzia 
- Guinea 
- Guolina 
- Gyrinophagus 
- Habritella 
- Habritys 
- Habromalina 
- Hadroepistenia 
- Haliplogeton 
- Halomalus 
- Halticoptera 
- Halticopterella 
- Halticopterina 
- Halticopteroides 
- Hansonita 
- Harrizia 
- Hedqvistia 
- Hedqvistina 
- Helocasis 
- Hemadas 
- Hemitrichus 
- Herbertia 
- Heteroprymna 
- Heteroschema 
- Hetreulophus 
- Heydenia 
- Heydeniopsis 
- Hillerita 
- Hirtonila 
- Hlavka 
- Hobbya 
- Holcaeus 
- Homoporus 
- Hubena 
- Huberina 
- Hyperimerus 
- Hypopteromalus 
- Idioporus 
- Indoclava 
- Inkaka 
- Ischyroptyx 
- Ismaya 
- Isocyrtella 
- Isocyrtus 
- Isoplatoides 
- Jaliscoa 
- Janssoniella 
- Kaleva 
- Kazina 
- Keesia 
- Keirana 
- Kerya 
- Klabonosa 
- Kneva 
- Kratinka 
- Kratka 
- Krivena 
- Ksenoplata 
- Kukua 
- Kumarella 
- Laesthiola 
- Lampoterma 
- Lamprotatus 
- Lanthanomyia 
- Lariophagus 
- Lasallea 
- Laticlypa 
- Lelaps 
- Lelapsomorpha 
- Lenka 
- Leodamus 
- Leptofoenus 
- Leptogasterites 
- Leptomeraporus 
- Licteria 
- Liepara 
- Lincolna 
- Lisseurytoma 
- Lomonosoffiella 
- Lonchetron 
- Longinucha 
- Lycisca 
- Lyrcus 
- Lysirina 
- Lyubana 
- Macroglenes 
- Macromesus 
- Makaronesa 
- Manineura 
- Maorita 
- Marxiana 
- Mauleus 
- Mayrellus 
- Mazinawa 
- Megadicylus 
- Megamelanosoma 
- Melancistrus 
- Merallus 
- Meraporus 
- Merismoclea 
- Merismomorpha 
- Merismus 
- Merisus 
- Mesamotura 
- Mesolelaps 
- Mesolelaps 
- Mesopeltita 
- Mesopolobus 
- Metacolus 
- Metastenus 
- Meximalus 
- Micradelus 
- Mimencyrtus 
- Mirekia 
- Miristhma 
- Miscogaster 
- Miscogasteriella 
- Mnoonema 
- Mokrzeckia 
- Monazosa 
- Monoksa 
- Moranila 
- Morodora 
- Muesebeckisia 
- Muscidifurax 
- Myrmicolelaps 
- Nadelaia 
- Nambouria 
- Narendrella 
- Nasonia 
- Nazgulia 
- Neanica 
- Neapterolelaps 
- Neboissia 
- Nedinotus 
- Nefoenus 
- Neocalosoter 
- Neocatolaccus 
- Neochalcissia 
- Neocylus 
- Neodipara 
- Neoepistenia 
- Neolelaps 
- Neolyubana 
- Neoperilampus 
- Neopolycystus 
- Neosciatheras 
- Neoskeloceras 
- Neotoxeumorpha 
- Nephelomalus 
- Nepistenia 
- Nerotolepsia 
- Netomocera 
- Nikolskayana 
- Nodisoplata 
- Norbanus 
- Nosodipara 
- Notanisus 
- Notoglyptus 
- Notoprymna 
- Novitzkyanus 
- Nuchata 
- Oaxa 
- Obalana 
- Ogloblinisca 
- Omphalodipara 
- Oniticellobia 
- Oodera 
- Oomara 
- Ophelosia 
- Oricoruna 
- Ormocerus 
- Ormyromorpha 
- Ottaria 
- Ottawita 
- Oxyglypta 
- Oxyharma 
- Oxysychus 
- Pachycrepoideus 
- Pachyneuron 
- Pachyneuronella 
- Pandelus 
- Panstenon 
- Papuopsia 
- Parabruchobius 
- Paracarotomus 
- Paracerocephala 
- Paracroclisis 
- Paradinarmus 
- Paraiemea 
- Paralaesthia 
- Paralamprotatus 
- Paralycisca 
- Parasaphodes 
- Paratomicobia 
- Parepistenia 
- Paroxyharma 
- Patiyana 
- Peckianus 
- Pegopus 
- Peridesmia 
- Perilampella 
- Perilampidea 
- Perilampomyia 
- Perniphora 
- Pestra 
- Petipirene 
- Pezilepsis 
- Phaenocytus 
- Plastobelyta 
- Platecrizotes 
- Platneptis 
- Platygerrhus 
- Platypteromalus 
- Playaspalangia 
- Ploskana 
- Plutothrix 
- Podivna 
- Polstonia 
- Premiscogaster 
- Procallitula 
- Proglochin 
- Promerisus 
- Promuscidea 
- Propicroscytus 
- Propodeia 
- Proshizonotus 
- Protoepistenia 
- Pseudanogmus 
- Pseudetroxys 
- Pseudocatolaccus 
- Pseudoceraphron 
- Psilocera 
- Psilonotus 
- Psychophagoides 
- Psychophagus 
- Pterapicus 
- Pterisemoppa 
- Pteromalinites 
- Pteromalus 
- Pterosemigastra 
- Pterosemopsis 
- Ptinocida 
- Pycnetron 
- Pyramidophoriella 
- Queenslandia 
- Quercanus 
- Rakosina 
- Raspela 
- Rhaphitelus 
- Rhicnocoelia 
- Rhopalicus 
- Riekisura 
- Rivasia 
- Rohatina 
- Romanisca 
- Roptrocerus 
- Scaphepistenia 
- Sceptrothelys 
- Schimitschekia 
- Schizonotus 
- Sciatherellus 
- Scutellista 
- Sedma 
- Seladerma 
- Selimnus 
- Semiotellus 
- Sennia 
- Shedoepistenia 
- Sigynia 
- Sirovena 
- Sisyridivora 
- Solenura 
- Sorosina 
- Spalangia 
- Spalangiopelta 
- Spaniopus 
- Spathopus 
- Sphaeripalpus 
- Sphegigaster 
- Sphegigastrella 
- Sphegipterosema 
- Sphegipterosemella 
- Spilomalus 
- Spinancistrus 
- Spintherus 
- Spodophagus 
- Staurothyreus 
- Stenetra 
- Stenomalina 
- Stenophrus 
- Stenoselma 
- Stichocrepis 
- Stictolelaps 
- Stictomischus 
- Stinoplus 
- Storeya 
- Strejcekia 
- Striatacanthus 
- Sympotomus 
- Synedrus 
- Syntomopus 
- Systasis 
- Systellogaster 
- Systolomorpha 
- Szelenyinus 
- Tanina 
- Tanzanicesa 
- Teasienna 
- Telepsogina 
- Termolampa 
- Terobiella 
- Thaumasura 
- Thektogaster 
- Theocolax 
- Thinodytes 
- Thureonella 
- Tomicobia 
- Tomicobiella 
- Tomicobomorpha 
- Tomicobomorphella 
- Tomocerodes 
- Toxeuma 
- Toxeumella 
- Toxeumelloides 
- Toxeumorpha 
- Trichargyrus 
- Trichilogaster 
- Trichokaleva 
- Trichomalopsis 
- Trichomalus 
- Tricolas 
- Tricyclomischus 
- Trigonoderopsis 
- Trigonoderus 
- Trigonogastrella 
- Trinotiscus 
- Tripteromalus 
- Tritneptis 
- Trjapitzinia 
- Trychnosoma 
- Tsela 
- Tumor 
- Uniclypea 
- Uriellopteromalus 
- Urolepis 
- Urolycisca 
- Usubaia 
- Uzka 
- Velepirene 
- Veltrusia 
- Vespita 
- Vrestovia 
- Watshamia 
- Westra 
- Westwoodiana 
- Wubina 
- Xantheurytoma 
- Xestomnaster 
- Xiphydriophagus 
- Yanchepia 
- Yosemitea 
- Yrka 
- Yusufia 
- Zdenekiana 
- Zeala 
- Zebe 
- Zolotarewskya 
†- Dominocephala

References

External links 

 Universal Chalcidoidea Database
 Catolaccus grandis Cornell U. Parasitoid of boll weevil
 Bugguide.net

 
Taxa named by Johan Wilhelm Dalman
Apocrita families